Meredeth Quick (born May 11, 1979 in Denver, Colorado) is a professional female squash player who represented the United States during her career. She reached a career-high world ranking of World No. 37 in December 2003 after having joined the Women's International Squash Players Association (WISPA) in 2002.

Her brother, Preston Quick, is also a squash player.

External links

References

1979 births
Living people
American female squash players
Pan American Games gold medalists for the United States
Pan American Games medalists in squash
Squash players at the 2003 Pan American Games
Sportspeople from Denver
Medalists at the 2003 Pan American Games
21st-century American women